The Bever is an approximately  river in western Germany, right tributary of the river Ems. It has its springs in the Teutoburg Forest. It runs through the northern part of North Rhine-Westphalia and flows into the Ems near Telgte (Westbevern). Another town on the Bever is Ostbevern.

References

External links
 https://web.archive.org/web/20070928043237/http://www.beveraue.de/ 

Rivers of North Rhine-Westphalia
Rivers of Germany